Ram Singh Patel (born 1 January 1983) is an Indian politician from Uttar Pradesh. He is a MLA from Patti and has served  same constituency from 2012 to 2017. He lost the 2017 election by a margin of 1,476 votes and has fought all elections as a Samajwadi Party member.

Personal life and education
Ram Singh Patel is the son of Bal Kumar Patel, former Lok Sabha MP from Mirzapur. Ram Patel is the nephew of Shiv Kumar Patel (Dadua) who died on 22 July 2007 in a police encounter.

He attended Feroze Gandhi College where obtained an MA degree. He also studied at Narvadeshwar Law College, Lucknow and received an LLB.

References

Indian National Congress politicians from Uttar Pradesh
Uttar Pradesh MLAs 2012–2017
Living people
Chhatrapati Shahu Ji Maharaj University alumni
Uttar Pradesh MLAs 2022–2027
1983 births